Violent Femmes is the debut album by Violent Femmes. Mostly recorded in July 1982, the album was released by Slash Records on vinyl and on cassette in April 1983, and on CD in 1987, with two extra tracks, "Ugly" and "Gimme the Car".

In 2002, Rhino Records remastered the album, filled out the disc's length with demos and added another disc of live tracks and a radio interview for a 20th anniversary special edition, with liner notes by Michael Azerrad.

Violent Femmes is the band's most successful album to date. The Recording Industry Association of America (RIAA) certified the album gold four years after its release and platinum four years after that, despite it never having appeared on the Billboard 200 albums chart. After achieving platinum certification on February 1, 1991, the album finally charted on the Billboard 200 for the first time on August 3, 1991, and peaked at number 171. Since Nielsen Music began electronically tracking sales in 1991, the album has sold 1.8 million copies. Blending RIAA certifications and Nielsen Music sales data, the record's American sales were estimated at three million as of 2016.

Background
Most of the songs on Violent Femmes and its follow-up were written when songwriter Gordon Gano was an 18-year-old high-school student in Milwaukee, Wisconsin.

The album was recorded at Castle Recording Studios in Lake Geneva, Wisconsin in July 1982.

Cover
The cover model is Billie Jo Campbell, a three-year-old girl who was walking down a Los Angeles street when she and her mother were approached and offered $100 for the photograph that became the album cover. The photograph depicts Campbell peering into the window of a house in Laurel Canyon. Campbell recollects: "I remember looking into that building, and they kept telling me there were animals in there, and I was pissed off ... I didn't know why they were making me look in this building. I had no idea there were photographers there. I was ... pissed off that I couldn't see the animals and I was all cranky by the end of it."

Reception

In a contemporary review for Rolling Stone, J. D. Considine wrote that Violent Femmes was precocious yet dynamic, with a good balance between Gano's direct lyrics and the full sound of the music. Robert Christgau of the Village Voice compared Gano to Jonathan Richman of the Modern Lovers. Gano himself grew tired of comparisons to Richman, as by his own account he was actually trying to sound like Steve Wynn of the Dream Syndicate.

In a retrospective write-up for AllMusic, Steve Huey called Violent Femmes "one of the most distinctive records of the early alternative movement and an enduring cult classic," noting that "the music also owes something to the Modern Lovers' minimalism, but powered by Brian Ritchie's busy acoustic bass riffing and the urgency and wild abandon of punk rock, the Femmes forged a sound all their own," while crediting Gano for keeping "the music engaging and compelling without overindulging in his seemingly willful naiveté."

Violent Femmes has been included in lists of the best albums of the 1980s by publications such as Pitchfork, who in a 2002 list ranked it 36th, and Slant Magazine, who in a 2012 list ranked it 21st. In 2014, PopMatters listed Violent Femmes as an essential alternative rock album of the 1980s. It also placed at number 974 in the 2000 edition of the book All Time Top 1000 Albums, and was included in the book 1001 Albums You Must Hear Before You Die.

Track listing

(Recorded at Music Works Studios, London, August 31–September 1, 1983)

Personnel
Violent Femmes
Victor DeLorenzo – snare drum, tranceaphone, drum set, scotch marching bass drum, backing vocals
Gordon Gano – acoustic and electric guitars, violin, lead vocals
Brian Ritchie – acoustic and electric bass guitars, xylophone, backing vocals

Additional personnel
Mark Van Hecke – production, piano on "Good Feeling"

Charts

Certifications

References

External links

Violent Femmes (Adobe Flash) at Radio3Net (streamed copy where licensed)

Violent Femmes albums
Slash Records albums
1983 debut albums